Ardalion Vasilyevich Ignatyev (November 24, 1930 – October 24, 1998) was a Soviet athlete who mainly competed in the 400 metres. He was born in the village of Novoye Toyderyakovo, Yalchiksky District, Chuvash ASSR.

He was European champion over 400 metres in 1954, when he also won a silver medal over 200 metres. He competed for the USSR in the 1956 Summer Olympics held in Melbourne, Australia in the 400 metres where he won the bronze medal jointly with Finland's Voitto Hellsten. After his career was finished, Ignatyev worked at sports school in Cheboksary as a director, and was also a lecturer at Yakovlev Chuvash State Pedagogical University from 1970-1976.

References

1930 births
1998 deaths
People from Yalchiksky District
Sportspeople from Chuvashia
Lesgaft National State University of Physical Education, Sport and Health alumni
Honoured Masters of Sport of the USSR
Recipients of the Order of the Red Banner of Labour
Russian male sprinters
Soviet male sprinters
Olympic bronze medalists for the Soviet Union
Athletes (track and field) at the 1952 Summer Olympics
Athletes (track and field) at the 1956 Summer Olympics
Olympic athletes of the Soviet Union
European Athletics Championships medalists
Medalists at the 1956 Summer Olympics
Olympic bronze medalists in athletics (track and field)